Klyuchi is a rural locality (a selo) and the administrative center of Klyuchevskoye Rural Settlement, Suksunsky District, Perm Krai, Russia. The population was 1,671 as of 2010. There are 14 streets.

Geography 
Klyuchi is located 16 km south of Suksun (the district's administrative centre) by road. Bryokhovo is the nearest rural locality.

References 

Rural localities in Perm Krai